Alexis Santos National High School is a secondary school in Bustos, Bulacan, Philippines.

References

High schools in Bulacan